Shree Airlines Pvt. Ltd. is an airline based in Kathmandu, Nepal, operating domestic services within Nepal, including chartered helicopter flights. The airline also conducts charter and non-charter flights to remote parts of the country and offers cargo charter services. As of 2018, Shree Airlines was the third largest domestic carrier in Nepal, after Buddha Air and Yeti Airlines, with a market share of 15.7%.

History

The airline was founded by Banwari Lal Mittal and was incorporated in the 1990s and was originally called Air Ananya, named after the founder's granddaughter Ananya Mittal.

Previously known as Shree Air, it is the largest operator of helicopters in Nepal with a fleet of Mi-17 helicopters. Nepal's then-largest helicopter operator Shree Airline diversified into fixed-wing operations by acquiring three jets in 2016 with plans to operate scheduled domestic flights out of Tribhuvan International Airport and investing NPRs 2 billion on its expansion project, these services are operated under the brand name Shree Airlines. 

During the COVID-19 pandemic in Nepal, Shree Airlines carried out charter flights to Singapore, marking the airlines' international flight debut.

Services

Humanitarian and UN peacekeeping flights
Shree Airlines operated helicopter flights for the World Food Program and the Nepal Food Corporation. These flights delivered food to the hungry and needy in the hard-to-reach parts of Nepal. Shree Airlines has delivered over 8,000,000 kilograms of food to the Nepalese population.

Shree Airlines also operated long-term charter flights for the United Nations, in support of peacekeeping operations in Uganda from 2008 to 2014. The UN canceled the contract after the ICAO attached the label "significant safety concern" to all Nepalese airlines. Four Mi-17 helicopters were left abandoned in Uganda after the cancelation of the mission, as the airline did not find it viable to bring the machines back to Nepal. As of September 2016, two Helicopters are still in Africa, while two more helicopters are currently being overhauled.

Religious tourism
Shree Airlines operates helicopter flights to Hilsa in north-west Nepal, which is at the northern border, and is the start point for the Mansarovar and Mount Kailash pilgrimage. The airline operates charter flights to Muktinath, a popular pilgrimage destination in mid-Nepal.

Destinations
Shree Airlines operates scheduled domestic flights to the following destinations as of January, 2020.

Fleet
The Shree Airlines fleet consists of the following aircraft (as of October 2019):

Accidents and incidents
 On 23 September 2006, a Shree Airlines Mil Mi-8 helicopter that operated on a chartered mission en route to Kathmandu crashed shortly after it departed Ghunsa, Taplejung. All four crew members and 20 passengers died in the crash, among them several senior officials of the World Wide Fund for Nature and Nepalese Government officials Gopal Rai and Harka Gurung and conservationist Chandra Gurung.
 On February 2, 2018, a Shree Airlines Bombardier CRJ200ER met a minor incident at  Gautam Buddha Airport, Bhairahawa. The wing tip of the aircraft was damaged as the aircraft hit the wing of a Yeti Airlines Jetstream 41 at parking bay of the airport.
 On October 5, 2021, a Shree Airlines Bombardier Dash 8 Q400-8 (9N-ANF) was about to depart for Nepalgunj when it skidded off the taxiway in the parking lot at Kathmandu. According to Kathmandu Airport No one was injured and the aircraft wasn't damaged. The Aircraft departed for Nepalgunj a few hours later.
 On March 10, 2023, the entire fleet of Shree Airlines was temporarily grounded by the CAAN a day after an engine fire occured mid-flight on one of their Bombardier Dash 8 Q-400 aircraft, forcing the aircraft to be diverted back to Kathmandu.

Sponsorships
Shree Airlines is an active sports and events sponsor, co-sponsoring the 2018 Dhangadhi Premier League and since 2019 sponsoring the Biratnagar Kings in cricket and the 2019 SAFF Women's Championship in football.

References

External links

 

Airlines of Nepal
Airlines established in 1999
Helicopter airlines
1999 establishments in Nepal